Ricaurte is a settlement in Magüí Payán Municipality, Nariño Department in Colombia.

Climate
Ricaurte has a very wet tropical rainforest climate (Af).

References

Nariño Department